Ugly American or similar could refer to:
The Ugly American, a 1958 novel by William Lederer and Eugene Burdick
The Ugly American (film), a 1963 film starring Marlon Brando, based on the 1958 novel 
Ugly American (pejorative), a term used to refer to perceptions of arrogant behavior by Americans abroad
Ugly Americans (band), an American rock band
The Ugly American (album), a 2002 album by Marc Eitzel
Ugly Americans (book), a 2004 book by Ben Mezrich
Ugly Americans (TV series), a 2010 television series